Qəzvinoba (also, Kazvinoba) is a village and municipality in the Masally Rayon of Azerbaijan.  It has a population of 1,070.

References 

Populated places in Masally District